Arved Ruusa (28 August 1900 – 15 December 1992) was an Estonian politician and lawyer. From 1971 to 1990 he was State Secretary of Estonia (in exile).
He was born in Vana-Kuuste Rural Municipality. In 1933 he graduated from the University of Tartu's Faculty of Law.

From 1928 until 1935, he was in police service. In 1944, he fled to Sweden.

References

1900 births
1992 deaths
Estonian politicians
20th-century Estonian lawyers
Estonian police officers
Estonian World War II refugees
Estonian emigrants to Sweden
University of Tartu alumni
People from Kambja Parish